St Arild's Church is a historic Anglican church near the village of Oldbury-on-the-Hill, Gloucestershire, England under the care of  The Churches Conservation Trust.  It  is recorded in the National Heritage List for England as a designated Grade II* listed building,  The church is dedicated to Arilda, a female saint who was a virgin and a martyr.  This is one of only two churches dedicated to her, the other being nearby at Oldbury-on-Severn.  Access to the church is across fields or through a farmyard.

History

The church originated in the 13th century, although most of its fabric dates from the late 15th or early 16th century.  Repairs were carried out in the 18th century.

Architecture

St Arild's is constructed in stone with a stone slate roof.  Its style is Perpendicular.  The plan consists of a nave and chancel, with a small north porch, and a west tower.  The tower is in three stages divided by string courses, with diagonal stepped buttresses in the lowest stage.  Also in the lowest stage is a two-light arched west window.  The middle stage has a small lancet window on the west side, and on all sides in the highest stage are two-light louvred bell openings.  At the top of the tower is a battlemented parapet.  The north porch is gabled, and in the north wall is a three-light ogee-headed window.  On the south side of the nave are four windows of different types.  The east window in the chancel has a three-light window containing Decorated (geometrical) tracery.

Internally there is a tall pointed tower arch.  The ceiling is plain and plastered.  Some 18th-century box pews are still present on the south side of the church, and there is also a two-tier pulpit.

See also
List of churches preserved by the Churches Conservation Trust in the English Midlands

References

External links
Photographs from rootsweb

Grade II* listed churches in Gloucestershire
Church of England church buildings in Gloucestershire
13th-century church buildings in England
English Gothic architecture in Gloucestershire
Churches preserved by the Churches Conservation Trust